A cleaner or a cleaning operative is a type of industrial or domestic worker who cleans homes or commercial premises for payment. Cleaning operatives may specialize in cleaning particular things or places, such as window cleaners. Cleaning operatives often work when the people who otherwise occupy the space are not around. They may clean offices at night or houses during the workday.

Types of cleaning operatives
The cleaning industry is quite big as different types of cleaning are required for different objects and different properties. For example, cleaning an office space requires the services of a commercial cleaner, whereas cleaning a house requires a residential cleaner or residential cleaning service. Depending on the task, even these categories can be subdivided into, for example, end-of-lease cleaning, carpet cleaning, upholstery cleaning, window cleaning, car cleaning services etc. Cleaners specialize in a specific cleaning sector or even a specific task in a cleaning sector, and one cannot expect a window cleaner to be able or willing to clean a carpet. Some types of cleaners are mentioned below.

Apartment/house cleaners
These cleaning operatives are quite easy to find due to their large numbers, and they are usually denoted as maid service providers, janitors, and domestic cleaning operatives. These type of operatives specialize in house cleaning services such as spring cleaning, end-of-lease cleaning etc.

Typical cleaning equipment

The following are some items used by cleaning staff:

 Broom/dustpan
 Buckets with water/cleaning solution
 Cleaning agents
 Floor polisher
 Garbage bag
 Hand feather duster and/or microfiber floor duster
 Mop and mop bucket cart
 Towels
 Vacuum cleaner
 Wet floor sign
Not always, but depending on the situation, (for example during cleaning dusty or dangerous substances or places, window cleaning at high heights, being on a busy street or in factories) items used by cleaning staff can include safety equipment such as:

 gloves
 overalls
 filter mask
 fitted hardhat
 height harness
 protective boots
 visibility clothing

Working conditions
The 2000 film Bread and Roses by British director Ken Loach depicted the struggle of cleaners in Los Angeles, California, for better pay and working conditions and for the right to join a union. In an interview with the BBC in 2001, Loach stated that thousands of cleaners from around 30 countries have since contacted him with tales similar to the one told in the film.

See also
 Charwoman
 Cleaning company
 Janitor (caretaker, custodian)
 Maid

References

Cleaning and maintenance occupations
Domestic work
Secondary sector of the economy